Davis Coombe is an American documentary film editor, writer, producer and director. He is best known for his work on The Social Dilemma, Casting JonBenet, Chasing Coral and Saving Face.
He is a member of the Academy of Motion Picture Arts and Sciences.

Filmography

Awards and nominations

References

External links
 

Living people
American documentary filmmakers
Documentary film editors
American documentary film directors
American documentary film producers
Year of birth missing (living people)